Dave Cirino (born David Riveria Cirino Jr.) is an American singer-songwriter, producer, and engineer whose single "Breath of Fresh" from his Spaceman EP can be heard on NBC's comedy series Up All Night (season 1 episode 5). He has produced music for Fox's television show New Girl and Showtime series Ray Donovan. He is signed with Aperture music, a licensing company licensing music for use in film, television, and commercials. He is prominent in the indie music scene releasing and producing music with DJ Statle for use in TV and film through Purple Fox Digital. Cirino has released mixtapes with DJ Kool Kid earlier in his career. He was the Myspace featured artist in 2009 and one of Yo! MTV Raps "Next Artist to Blow" in 2007 by yoraps.com.

In 2011, Cirino released the song "Tokyo Love" as a tribute to his fan base in Japan. Cirino's drummer, Tomoyasu Ikuta, hails from Japan and brings significant influence to the music. Cirino has a deep appreciation for European culture and music and creates from this inspiration. His latest album Spaceman Reloaded released on March 31, 2015, through Kobalt music/futuremgmt.

Cirino has gained a substantial fan base among independent artists around the world as a result of his YouTube tutorials on building a home studio. The tutorials teach aspiring artists, engineers, and producers step by step how to construct their home-based studios encouraging them to stay creative.

Discography
 2009 – Backpaks and Yak (mixtape)
 2009 – Spaceman EP
 2011 –  "Shaggy's Girl" (single)
 2011 –  Dragon Theory
 2015 – Spaceman Reloaded

References

American male singer-songwriters
American singer-songwriters
Living people
Place of birth missing (living people)
Year of birth missing (living people)
American record producers